Academy for Jewish Religion may refer to:

 Academy for Jewish Religion (California)
 Academy for Jewish Religion (New York)